Hedriodiscus leucogaster is a species of soldier fly in the family Stratiomyidae.

Distribution
United States, Colombia, Mexico.

References

Stratiomyidae
Insects described in 1933
Diptera of North America
Diptera of South America